2014 Olympics may refer to:

 2014 Winter Olympics, held in Sochi, Russia
 2014 Summer Youth Olympics, held in Nanjing, China